Fast Times is an American sitcom based on the 1982 movie Fast Times at Ridgemont High that was produced by Amy Heckerling, who directed the original film. It ran for 7 episodes on CBS from March 3 until April 23, 1986. Cameron Crowe, who wrote the original Fast Times novel and film screenplay, served as creative consultant. Moon Unit Zappa participated as a technical consultant. She was hired in order to research slang terms and mannerisms of teenagers, as she had just graduated from high school at the time and had a much better grasp of then-current high school behavior than the writers. Oingo Boingo provided the theme song.

Ray Walston and Vincent Schiavelli were the only actors from the movie to reprise their roles for the TV series.

Cast
Claudia Wells as Linda Barrett
Courtney Thorne-Smith as Stacy Hamilton
James Nardini as Brad Hamilton
Wally Ward as Mark Ratner
Patrick Dempsey as Mike Damone
Kit McDonough as Leslie Melon
Dean Cameron as Jeff Spicoli
Ray Walston as Mr. Hand
Vincent Schiavelli as Mr. Vargas

Episodes

Response
Jeff Borden of The Charlotte Observer observed the series' biggest downfall: "The challenge 'Fast Times' faces is emphasizing the comedic elements from the R-rated film while soft-pedaling the teen lust aspects that were a major part of the movie. Comic characters like spaced-out surfer Jeff Spicoli fare well, while subtle characters like fast-food king and would-be ladies man Brad Hamilton are sanitized into blandness."

Christopher Cornell, writing in The Philadelphia Inquirer, echoed the sentiment: "People who liked the movie (read: teenagers) will tune in expecting something like what they saw in the theater. But the network is going to have to completely eliminate the movie's cheerfully rampant drug use and tone down the lusty sexual content, so that parents won't be uncomfortable."

However, Borden calls Fast Times "the hippest look at high school life since the late, lamented Square Pegs few seasons back, yet it treats the teachers with compassion and respect. An 'us vs. them' mentality is avoided." Mike Duffy of the Detroit Press disagreed entirely, saying "With 'Fast Times,' we have 'Dull Pegs'."

Mark Dawidziak of the Akron Beacon Journal was far less than kind to the sitcom: "Just when you thought the CBS Wednesday schedule couldn't get any worse, along comes these two lethal stinkers (Fast Times and another series that preceded it, Tough Cookies). It would be better if the network programmers turned the hour over to repeated tests by the Emergency Broadcast System. It would be better, and considerably more entertaining, if they devoted the hour to a reading of the Newark Yellow Pages. It would be better, and far more merciful, if they just went dark. Just about anything would be kinder than subjecting even a few stray viewers to this video swill. Indeed, Tough Cookies and Fast Times make Stir Crazy look like television's answer to Ulysses."

References

External links

Fast Times at JumpTheShark.com

1986 American television series debuts
1986 American television series endings
1980s American high school television series
1980s American teen sitcoms
CBS original programming
English-language television shows
Live action television shows based on films
Television series about teenagers
Television series by Universal Television
Television shows set in Los Angeles